This is a summary list of all the top singles in the VG-lista, the official Norwegian hit-chart, from 1964 to 1994. For detailed listings week by week for number-one positions from 1995 onwards, see List of number-one songs in Norway.

1964
 The Beatles - "She Loves You"
 The Beatles - "I Want to Hold Your Hand"
 The Swinging Blue Jeans - "Hippy Hippy Shake"
 Wenche Myhre - "La meg være ung"
 Jim Reeves - "I Love You Because"
 The Beatles - "A Hard Day's Night"
 Jim Reeves - "I Won't Forget You"
 The Beatles - "I Should Have Known Better"
 Roy Orbison - "Oh Pretty Woman"
 The Beatles - "If I Fell"
 The Beatles - "I Feel Fine"

1965
 Sven-Ingvars - "Fröken Fräken"
 The Beatles - "Rock and Roll Music"
 The Rolling Stones - "The Last Time"
 France Gall - "Poupée de cire, poupée de son"
 The Beatles - "Ticket to Ride"
 Roger Miller - "King of the Road"
 Jailbird Singers - "Där björkarna susa"
 Hep Stars - "Cadillac"
 Elvis Presley - "Crying in the Chapel"
 The Spotnicks - "Blue Blue Day"
 The Beatles - "Help!"
 The Rolling Stones - "(I Can't Get No) Satisfaction"
 Barry McGuire - "Eve of Destruction"
 The Beatles - "Yesterday"
 The Beatles - "Day Tripper"

1966
 Barry McGuire - "You Were on My Mind"
 The Overlanders - "Michelle"
 The Beatles - "Michelle"
 The Beach Boys - "Barbara Ann"
 The Beach Boys - "Sloop John B"
 The Beatles - "Paperback Writer"
 The Kinks - "Sunny Afternoon"
 The Beatles - "Yellow Submarine/Eleanor Rigby"
 Sonny & Cher - "Little Man"
 Herman's Hermits - "No Milk Today"

1967
 Tom Jones - "Green, Green Grass of Home"
 The Monkees - "I'm a Believer"
 The Beatles - "Penny Lane/Strawberry Fields Forever"
 Sandie Shaw - "Puppet on a String"
 Nancy Sinatra & Frank Sinatra - "Somethin' Stupid"
 The Monkees - "Theme From The Monkees"
 The Tremeloes - "Silence Is Golden"
 The Beatles - "All You Need Is Love"
 Scott McKenzie - "San Francisco (Be Sure to Wear Flowers in Your Hair)"
 Box Tops - "The Letter"
 Bee Gees - "Massachusetts"
 Sven-Ingvars - "Önskebrunnen"
 The Beatles - "Hello, Goodbye"

1968
 Anna-Lena Löfgren - "Lyckliga Gatan"
 Cliff Richard - "Congratulations"
 Gary Puckett & The Union Gap - "Young Girl"
 Gunnar Wicklund - "Vi skal gå hand i hand"
 Nancy Sinatra & Dean Martin - "Things"
 Inger Lise Andersen - "Romeo og Julie"
 The Beatles - "Hey Jude/Revolution"
 Mary Hopkin - "Those Were The Days"
 Gluntan - "Langs hver en vei"
 Inger Lise Andersen - "Fru Johnsen"

1969
 Marmalade - "Ob-La-Di, Ob-La-Da"
 Kirsti Sparboe - "Oj, Oj, Oj, Så Glad Jeg Skal Bli"
 Lulu - "Boom Bang-a-Bang"
 The Beatles - "Get Back"
 The Beatles - "The Ballad of John and Yoko"
 Elvis Presley - "In the Ghetto"
 Zager & Evans - "In the Year 2525"
 Jane Birkin & Serge Gainsbourg - "Je t'aime... moi non plus"
 The Archies - "Sugar Sugar"

1970
 B.J. Thomas - "Raindrops Keep Falling on My Head"
 Stevie Wonder - "Yester-Me, Yester-You, Yesterday"
 The Beatles - "Let It Be"
 Frijid Pink - "The House of the Rising Sun"
 Christie - "Yellow River"
 Mungo Jerry - "In the Summertime"
 The Beach Boys - "Cottonfields"
 Anita Hegerland - "Mitt sommarlov"
 Creedence Clearwater Revival - "Lookin' Out My Back Door"
 Gro Anita Schønn - "En enkel sang om frihet"

1971
 Neil Diamond - "Cracklin' Rosie"
 George Harrison - "My Sweet Lord"
 Lynn Anderson - "(I Never Promised You a) Rose Garden"
 Middle of the Road - "Chirpy Chirpy Cheep Cheep"
 Ocean - "Put Your Hand in the Hand"
 Pop Tops - "Mamy Blue"
 Middle of the Road - "Soley Soley"

1972
 Middle of the Road - "Sacramento"
 New Seekers - "Beg, Steal or Borrow"
 Ann-Louise Hanson - "Tag emot en utsträckt hand"
 Stein Ingebrigtsen - "Cento Campane"
 Daniel Boone - "Beautiful Sunday"
 Hot Butter - "Popcorn"
 Gilbert O'Sullivan - "Matrimony"
 Gilbert O'Sullivan - "Clair"

1973
 Wenche Myhre - "Jeg og du og vi to"
 Cliff Richard - "Power to All Our Friends"
 Dawn - "Tie a Yellow Ribbon Round the Ole Oak Tree"
 Stein Ingebrigtsen - "Bare du"
 Albert Hammond - "Free Electric Band"
 Lillebjørn Nilsen - "Barn av regnbuen"

1974
 The Rolling Stones - "Angie"
 Inger Lise Rypdal - "En spennende dag for Josefine"
 Suzi Quatro - "Devil Gate Drive"
 ABBA - "Waterloo"
 Terry Jacks - "Seasons in the Sun"
 Terry Jacks - "If You Go Away"
 George McCrae - "Rock Your Baby"
 Hans Petter Hansen - "Jeg kommer snart igjen"

1975
 Slade - "Far Far Away"
 Billy Swan - "I Can Help"
 Teach-In - "Ding-A-Dong"
 Nazareth - "Love Hurts"
 George Baker Selection - "Paloma Blanca"
 Rod Stewart - "Sailing"

1976
 Roger Whittaker - "The Last Farewell"
 Harpo - "Movie Star"
 Brotherhood of Man - "Save Your Kisses for Me"
 ABBA - "Dancing Queen"
 Pussycat - "Mississippi"

1977
 Boney M. - "Daddy Cool"
 Smokie - "Living Next Door To Alice"
 Boney M - "Ma Baker"
 The Manhattan Transfer - "Chanson D'Amour"
 Baccara - "Yes Sir, I Can Boogie"
 Baccara - "Sorry, I'm a Lady"

1978
 Baccara - "Darling"
 Bonnie Tyler - "It's a Heartache"
 Jahn Teigen - "Mil etter mil"
 Boney M - "Rivers of Babylon"
 John Travolta & Olivia Newton-John - "You're the One That I Want"
 Geir Børresen & Smurfene - "Smurfesangen"

1979
 Bee Gees - "Too Much Heaven"
 Frankie Miller - "Darlin'"
 Milk and Honey - "Hallelujah"
 Anita Ward - "Ring My Bell"
 Patrick Hernandez - "Born to Be Alive"
 Frank Zappa - "Bobby Brown"
 Cliff Richard - "We Don't Talk Anymore"

1980
 Michael Jackson - "Don't Stop 'Til You Get Enough"
 Pink Floyd - "Another Brick in the Wall, Part II"
 Sverre Kjelsberg & Mattis Hætta - "Sámiid Ædnan"
 Johnny Logan - "What's Another Year"
 Olivia Newton-John & Electric Light Orchestra - "Xanadu"
 Lipps Inc - "Funkytown"
 The Kids - "Hun er forelska i lærer'n"
 Diana Ross - "Upside Down"
 Ottawan - "D.I.S.C.O."
 Barbra Streisand - "Woman in Love"

1981
 Lars Kilevold - "Livet er for kjipt"
 Gyllene Tider - "När vi två blir en"
 Jannicke - "Svake mennesker"
 Jon English and Mario Millo - "Against the Wind"/"Six Ribbons"
 Beranek - "Dra til hælvete"
 Caramba - "Hubba Hubba Zoot-Zoot"
 Kim Carnes - "Bette Davis Eyes"
 Sheena Easton - "For Your Eyes Only"
 Ottawan - "Hands Up (Give Me Your Heart)"

1982
 Casino Steel & Gary Holton - "Ruby, Don't Take Your Love to Town"
 Electronicas - "Dance Little Bird"
 Shakin' Stevens - "Oh Julie"
 Christopher Cross - "Arthur's Theme (Best That You Can Do)"
 The Human League - "Don't You Want Me"
 Paul McCartney & Stevie Wonder - "Ebony and Ivory"
 Nicole - "Ein Bißchen Frieden"
 David Bowie - "Cat People (Putting Out Fire)"
 Survivor - "Eye of the Tiger"
 Bolland & Bolland - "You're In the Army Now"
 F. R. David - "Words"

1983
 Renée and Renato - "Save Your Love"
 David Bowie - "Let's Dance"
 Carola - "Främling"
 Bonnie Tyler - "Total Eclipse of the Heart"
 Agnetha Fältskog - "The Heat is On"
 Mike Oldfield - "Moonlight Shadow"
 Irene Cara - "Flashdance... What a Feeling"
 The Monroes - "Sunday People"
 Paul McCartney & Michael Jackson - "Say Say Say"
 Culture Club - "Karma Chameleon"
 Tracey Ullman - "They Don't Know"

1984
 Matthew Wilder - "Break My Stride"
 Slade - "My Oh My"
 Cyndi Lauper - "Girls Just Want to Have Fun"
 Mel Brooks - "To Be or Not To Be"
 Break Machine - "Street Dance"
 Phil Collins - "Against All Odds"
 Wham! - "Wake Me Up Before You Go-Go"
 Stevie Wonder - "I Just Called to Say I Love You"
 Wham! - "Freedom"
 Limahl - "Neverending Story"

1985
 Band Aid - "Do They Know It's Christmas?"
 Foreigner - "I Want to Know What Love Is"
 VideoKids - "Woodpeckers from Space"
 USA for Africa - "We Are the World"
 Bobbysocks - "La det swinge"
 Paul Hardcastle - "19"
 Sandra - "Maria Magdalena"
 Eurythmics - "There Must Be An Angel"
 The Monroes - "Cheerio"
 a-ha - "Take On Me"
 Modern Talking - "Cheri Cheri Lady"
 Jennifer Rush - "Power of Love"
 Lionel Richie - "Say You, Say Me"

1986
 Pet Shop Boys - "West End Girls"
 Bobbysocks - "Waiting for the Morning"
 Billy Ocean - "When the Going Gets Tough"
 Mr. Mister - "Kyrie"
 George Michael - "A Different Corner"
 Hear 'n Aid - "Stars"
 Falco - "Jeanny"
 Samantha Fox - "Touch Me (I Want Your Body)"
 Madonna - "Papa Don't Preach"
 Lionel Richie - "Dancing on the Ceiling"
 Chris de Burgh - "The Lady in Red"
 a-ha - "I've Been Losing You"
 Cutting Crew - "(I Just) Died in Your Arms"
 Bob Geldof - "This is the World Calling"

1987
 Bon Jovi - "Livin' on a Prayer"
 Kim Wilde - "You Keep Me Hangin' On"
 Gary Moore - "Over the Hills and Far Away"
 Boy George - "Everything I Own"
 Ferry Aid - "Let It Be"
 Whitney Houston - "I Wanna Dance With Somebody"
 a-ha - "The Living Daylights"
 Michael Jackson - "I Just Can't Stop Loving You"
 Pet Shop Boys - "It's a Sin"
 Desireless - "Voyage Voyage"
 Bruce Springsteen - "Brilliant Disguise"
 Rick Astley - "Never Gonna Give You Up"
 Bee Gees - "You Win Again"
 T'Pau - "China in Your Hand"

1988
 Belinda Carlisle - "Heaven Is a Place on Earth"
 Billy Ocean - "Get Outta My Dreams, Get into My Car"
 a-ha - "Stay on These Roads"
 Prince - "Alphabet St."
 Ofra Haza - "Im Nin'Alu"
 Tindrum - "Drums of War"
 Viggo Sandvik - "Fisking i Valdres"
 Europe - "Superstitious"
 Transvision Vamp - "I Want Your Love"
 Vidar Theisen & The Retrievers - "Heavy Metal"
 Koreana - "Hand in Hand"
 One 2 Many - "Downtown"
 Sam Brown - "Stop!"

1989
 Robin Beck - "First Time"
 Will To Power - "Baby, I Love Your Way"
 Paula Abdul - "Straight Up"
 Madonna - "Like a Prayer"
 Roxette - "The Look"
 The Bangles - "Eternal Flame"
 Prince - "Batdance"
 Franklin - "Bombadilla Life"
 Jive Bunny and the Mastermixers - "Swing the Mood"
 Kaoma - "Lambada"
 Phil Collins - "Another Day in Paradise"

1990
 Lisa Stansfield - "All Around the World"
 Sinéad O'Connor - "Nothing Compares 2 U"
 Madonna - "Vogue"
 Alannah Myles - "Black Velvet"
 Roxette - "It Must Have Been Love"
 a-ha - "Crying in the Rain"
 Maria McKee - "Show Me Heaven"

1991
 Enigma - "Sadeness (Part I)"
 Inner Circle - "Bad Boys"
 The Simpsons - "Do the Bartman"
 Roxette - "Joyride"
 Cher - "The Shoop Shoop Song"
 Scorpions - "Wind of Change"
 Zucchero & Paul Young - "Senza una donna"
 Bryan Adams - "(Everything I Do) I Do It for You"
 U2 - "The Fly"
 Michael Jackson - "Black or White"

1992
 George Michael & Elton John - "Don't Let the Sun Go Down on Me"
 Ten Sharp - "You"
 Go-Go Gorilla - "Mother Porno"
 Go-Go Gorilla - "Go-Go Gorilla"
 Bruce Springsteen - "Human Touch"
 Mr Big - "To Be with You"
 U96 - "Das Boot"
 Maggie Reilly - "Everytime We Touch"
 Roxette - "How Do You Do!"
 Michael Learns To Rock - "The Actor"
 Bon Jovi - "Keep the Faith"
 Ace of Base - "Wheel of Fortune"

1993
 Whitney Houston - "I Will Always Love You"
 2 Unlimited - "No Limit"
 Snow - "Informer"
 Haddaway - "What Is Love"
 Culture Beat - "Mr Vain"
 4 Non Blondes - "What's Up"
 Freddie Mercury - "Living on My Own"
 Meat Loaf - "I'd Do Anything for Love (But I Won't Do That)"
 Bryan Adams - "Please Forgive Me"

1994
 Aerosmith - "Cryin'"
 Bryan Adams, Rod Stewart & Sting - "All For Love"
 Sissel Kyrkjebø - "Se ilden lyse"
 Enigma - "Return to Innocence"
 Bruce Springsteen - "Streets of Philadelphia"
 Beck - "Loser"
 Crash Test Dummies - "Mmm Mmm Mmm Mmm"
 Wet Wet Wet - "Love Is All Around"
 Rednex - "Cotton Eye Joe"

References

Norwegian record charts
Norwegian music-related lists